Tongue of the Fatman (also known as Mondu's Fight Palace on the Commodore 64, Fatman for its Japanese release, and Slaughter Sport in its Sega Genesis iteration) is a 1989 fighting game developed by Activision and published by Sanritsu.

Overview

The game gives the player ten races to choose from, each race having its own special moves. The original version of the game starts with the player having 3 species to choose from, unlocking new characters by defeating them in battle. These races include the Humanoid, CyberDroid, Cryoplasts, Amazoid, Bi-Husker, Rayzor, Mammath, Puftian, Colonoid, and lastly, the Celluloid. The game consists of 10 matches, facing off with each race from left to right of the given list. Mondu The Fat is the champion of the fight palace and the last obstacle of the game. The Fat Man's special ability is the "Tongue Lash", where his belly opens and sprawls out a tongue tweak that jabs the enemy. Despite this being the final boss fight of the game, players have defeated Mondu in as little as 5 seconds.

Items

In-game currency is earned after the completion of each match, and the money earned can be increased through wagering. The player starts off with $1000 to spend on items and wager with. Wagers placed are based on the time it takes for them to defeat their opponent, if players exceed the given time restraint they will lose the bet, but they can still win the initial purse prize money by winning the match. The merchant's shop is set up with six items on the first three pages, with the fourth page holding one of four random items that rotate out every match. The player and combatant are both allowed to carry up to four items in each match. There are a total of 24 different items in the game; all of which are consumed upon use.

Gameplay

There are three status bars, with the blue bar representing the character's hit points, the green bar standing for the crowds favor, and the red bar displaying the effectiveness of techniques. The red bar is, the less damage your opponent takes from attacks, this bar declines after repeating the same offensive maneuver. This status bar is a clever balancing mechanic that makes spamming attacks less reliable and a less effective tactic. As for controls, the DOS platform to the PC version has been referred to as "clunky". Each character has 15 basic moves and 1 unique special ability that varies for each race. With each go around, the player has a maximum of 3 losses, every loss puts the player back two fights in the roster, and each of these defeats cost $100 for the good doctor to revive the player's mangled corpse.

Reception

Tongue of the Fatman was positively received in its original release, but was looked upon negatively in retrospect. Both Game Revolution and CNET ranked it in their list of the worst video game names ever, whilst Mondu, the game's antagonist, was ranked among UGO's list of the "Unsexiest Sexy Video Game Characters" coming in at number 3. Tongue of the Fatman received a spot in PC Gamer's list of the "15 Weirdest PC Games Of All Time", stating that "For raw, eye-popping 'What the crap?!'ery though, you can't do much better than this alien blood sport."

The editors of Game Player's PC Strategy Guide gave Tongue of the Fatman their 1989 "Best PC Arcade/Action Game" award. They wrote, "Activision's graphics are as wild as Fatmans title, and the game play is more than satisfactory.".

References

1989 video games
Activision games
Commodore 64 games
DOS games
Dystopian video games
Sega Genesis games
Video games about death games
Video games scored by Russell Lieblich
Fighting games
Sanritsu Denki games
Video games developed in the United States